Our Lady of Sion College is a Catholic school for girls located in Box Hill, Melbourne, Australia.

The college educates around 950 girls from Year 7 to Year 12. The current principal is Tina Apostolopoulos.

The school is run by the RC Sisters of Sion, a religious order committed to improving Jewish-Christian relations.

Sport 
Sion is a member of Girls Sport Victoria (GSV).

GSV premierships 
Sion has won the following GSV premierships.

 Netball - 2019
 Softball - 2015

Notable alumni 
Deborah Lawrie – Australia's first female commercial airline pilot
Rachael Haynes – Australian Women's Cricket Captain (Ashes 2017) and Women's Big Bash League player (Sydney Thunder)

References

External links 
Our Lady of Sion College website

Catholic secondary schools in Melbourne
Girls' schools in Victoria (Australia)
Educational institutions established in 1928
Alliance of Girls' Schools Australasia
1928 establishments in Australia
Buildings and structures in the City of Whitehorse